This is a list of fellows of the Royal Society elected in 1977.

Fellows

Erich Armand Arthur Joseph Huckel  (1896–1980)
Alfred Spinks  (1917–1982)
Oliver Louis Zangwill  (1913–1987)
Sir Richard Oswald Chandler Norman  (1932–1993)
Frank Pasquill  (1914–1994)
Richard Hume Adrian 2nd Baron Adrian of Cambridge (1927–1995)
William John Strang  (1921–1999)
Gopalasamudram Narayana Ramachandran  (1922–2001)
Vincent Massey  (1926–2002)
John Maynard Smith  (1920–2004)
Rendel Sebastian Pease  (1922–2004)
Isabella Helen Mary Muir  (1920–2005)
Sir Thomas Richard Edmund Southwood  (1931–2005)
Alan Arthur Wells  (d. 2005)
Setsuro Ebashi  (1922–2006)
Edward Arthur Boyse  (d. 2007)
Edward Granville Broadbent  (d. 2008)
David Henry Cushing  (d. 2008)
Jeremy Randall Knowles  (d. 2008)
Izrael Moiseivich Gelfand  (d. 2009)
Ephraim Katchalski-Katzir  (d. 2009)
Alec Douglas Bangham  (d. 2010)
John Philip Cooper  (1923–2011)
Cyril Domb  (1920–2012)
Peter Orlebar Bishop  (d. 2012)
Peter Gray  (d. 2012)
Bruce Bilby  (1922–2013)
Donald Thomas Anderson
Sir Eric Albert Ash
John Bingham
Martin Harold Phillips Bott
Peter Chadwick
Alexander Lamb Cullen
Peter Duncumb
Ronald James Gillespie
Jeffrey Goldstone
Leon Mestel
Stephen Erwin Moorbath
John Raymond Postgate
John Robert Ringrose
Sir William Duncan Paterson Stewart
Sir John Meurig Thomas
Sir David John Weatherall
Sir Arnold Whittaker Wolfendale

References

1977
1977 in science
1977 in the United Kingdom